Gullgubber (Norwegian) or guldgubber (Danish), guldgubbar (Swedish),  are art-objects, amulets, or offerings found in Scandinavia and dating to the Nordic Iron Age.

The word gullgubbe means "little old man of gold" and is taken from a report published in 1791 by Nils Henrik Sjöborg, in which he said that villagers in Ravlunda, Scania, who found them in the dunes called them guldgubbar.

Approximately 3,000 gullgubber have been found, from approximately 30 sites in Norway, Sweden, and the greatest number in Denmark. Relatively few gullgubber have so far been found in Norway, although 19 were found during excavations at Vingrom church in Oppland between 2003 and 2005, and the distribution of finds may be affected by modern circumstances as much as the political situation at the time they were laid down.

They date to the late Iron Age, from the end of the Migration Age to the early Viking Age, particularly what is referred to in Norway as the Merovingian era, in Sweden as the Vendel era, from 550 to about 800, but can be hard to date because they are often found in contexts that do not establish date. It seems likely that they replaced bracteates, which require far more metal, after obtaining gold from the Byzantine Empire became difficult.

Iconography and purpose
Many of the gullgubber that have been found in Norway and Sweden depict a man and a woman facing each other, sometimes embracing, sometimes with a branch or a tree visible between them. Sometimes the figures' knees are bent and they may be dancing. They are almost always clothed, with the clothes generally depicted carefully and more formal than casual. Some have only a single figure, either male or female, or an animal. A few are unstamped cutouts. Sharon Ratke, in her dissertation on the gullgubber, has added a further category of "wraiths" and suggests that they may indicate that some gullgubber were a tribute to the dead or to travellers. She rejects the notion of dancing, interpreting those figures as static and classing them among the wraiths.

A common interpretation of the motif of the man and woman on the gullgubber is that it symbolises the sacred marriage between the Vanir-god Freyr and the jötunn Gerðr, which we know of from the Eddic poem Skírnismál. Some have interpreted the tree branch as a reference to the grove, Barri, where Gerðr agrees to meet Freyr; others have noted its resemblance to the Garden Angelica, a plant associated with fertility. The thinking is that the deposition of the gullgubber was intended to ensure fertility, or that it was intended as a depiction of the mythical pair who gave rise to a chieftainly line. From historical sources, for example, we know that the Yngling line traced its ancestry to Fjölnir, son of Gerðr and Freyr.

Recent finds have somewhat changed the view of gullgubber. Almost 2,500 have been found at Sorte Muld, on the Danish island of Bornholm, by far the highest number at any site. And in 2000–2004, 122, the second highest number, were found not far away at Uppåkra, Scania, Sweden. Several of those found at the two sites are similar; some were made using the same dies or patrices, and four dies and part of a fifth were found at Uppåkra, which was therefore presumably the point of manufacture for at least some of the Sorte Muld gullgubber. In addition, some gullgubber found at some other sites also show strong similarities to some from Uppåkra, and some from Uppåkra are unusually sharp in their details. At Uppåkra they were found in postholes and wall ditches of a building that is interpreted as a heathen hof partly on the basis of their presence as votive offerings, which is how they are now generally interpreted.

Recent attempts have been made to interpret the gestures of the couples depicted on gullgubber in terms of medieval sources such as the Sachsenspiegel, as denoting betrothal, for example. However, at both Uppåkra and Sorte Muld, the majority of the gullgubber do not depict couples. At Uppåkra, most depict men, a smaller number depict women, and only a few depict couples. Some iconographic features of the single figures – a thumb to the mouth gesture associated with being a seer as in representations of the legend of Sigurð, a group of figures with clubs and two others with staffs or sceptres of differing lengths – have been seen as relating to individual Norse gods.

Locations of finds
Gullgubber have been found at 42 sites in Norway, Sweden, and in greatest numbers in Denmark. Some of the most notable locations are:
 Borg, Lofoten, Norway
 Borge, Østfold, Norway
 Mære church, Nord-Trøndelag, Norway – 9th century, found during excavations in 1968
 Vingrom church, Lillehammer, Norway – found during excavations between 2003 and 2005
 Kongsvik, Tjeldsund, Nordland, Norway – found in the 1740s
 Hauge, Klepp, Rogaland, Norway – approx. 700-800 C.E.
 Slöinge, Halland, Sweden – approx. 690 C.E.
 Helgö, Uppland, Sweden
 Uppåkra, near Lund, Scania, Sweden – 111 found
 Sorte Muld, Bornholm, Denmark – 2,480 found, dated together with those at Uppåkra to the 6th century
 Lundeborg, Gudme, Funen, Denmark – about 100
 Västra Vång, Blekinge, Sweden – 29 found in 2013, the third-highest number in Sweden.

About 1800 gullgubber are on display in the Bornholm Museum in Rønne. Most of the gullgubber from Uppåkra can be seen at the Historical Museum at Lund University.

References

Sources
 Jan Peder Lamm. "Figural Gold Foils Found in Sweden". In Helen Clarke and Kristina Lamm (ed.) Excavations at Helgö XVI: Exotic and Sacral Finds from Helgö. Stockholm: Almqvist & Wiksell, 2004. 
 Margrethe Watt. "Die Goldblechfiguren ('guldgubber') aus Sorte Muld, Bornholm". In Karl Hauck (ed.) Der historische Horizont der Götterbild-Amulette aus der Übergangsepoche von der Spätantike zum Frühmittelalter: Bericht über das Colloquium vom 28.11.-1.12.1988 in der Werner-Reimers-Stiftung, Bad Homburg. Göttingen: Vandenhoeck & Ruprecht, 1992. . pp. 195–227.
 Margrethe Watt. "Guldgubber". In Christian Adamsen, Ulla Lund Hansen, Finn Ole Nielsen, Margrethe Watt (ed.) Sorte Muld. Rønne: Bornholms Museum og Kulturarvsstyrelsen, 2008, . pp. 42–53.

External links
 Drawings of Gold Foil Figures (Guldgubbar, Goldblechfiguren) from Slöinge
 Sharon Ratke's site on the Guldgubber 

Viking art
Germanic archaeological artifacts
Scandinavian archaeology
Vendel Period